There have been two state highways designated Route 17 in Massachusetts:
The first Route 17 extended from Great Barrington to the New York state line in the 1930s, and was renumbered as Route 23 in 1939.
The second Route 17 was a portion of U.S. Route 1 in the 1950s. This was due to the U.S. Highway being moved to a freeway from Danvers to Salisbury at the New Hampshire border. The former U.S. Route 1 segment was designated as Route 17 to the state line and NH 17 for a short distance into Seabrook, New Hampshire. The freeway was later designated as Interstate 95, and Route 17 and NH 17 were restored to being U.S. Route 1. The Route 17 designation was in use by June 1956 and out of use by July 1959.

References

Further reading

External links
 1956 Highway map of Massachusetts (includes Route 17) via davidrumsey.com
 1956 House Bill 1322, 1957 House Bill 0496, 1957 House Bill 2847, 1958 House Bill 2735 via archives.lib.state.ma.us

017
Former numbered highways in the United States
U.S. Route 1